John Francis Smithwick (184427 August 1913) was an Irish businessman and politician.

John Francis Smithwick was a member of the Smithwick's brewing family and took over as head of the firm. He was active in local politics, twice becoming High Sheriff of County Kilkenny and once of Kilkenny City, of which he was mayor in 1884. He was the first chairman of Kilkenny County Council, and one of the Auditors of the National Bank.

From 1880 to 1886 he was Member of Parliament for Kilkenny City, a member of the Home Rule League. As a supporter of Charles Stewart Parnell he was one of the 32 members who were suspended in the sitting of 3 February 1881.

Notes

External links 

1844 births
1913 deaths
Irish Parliamentary Party MPs
Members of the Parliament of the United Kingdom for County Kilkenny constituencies (1801–1922)
UK MPs 1880–1885
UK MPs 1885–1886
Mayors of Kilkenny
19th-century Irish businesspeople